The meridian 110° west of Greenwich is a line of longitude that extends from the North Pole across the Arctic Ocean, North America, the Pacific Ocean, the Southern Ocean, and Antarctica to the South Pole.

The 110th meridian west forms a great circle with the 70th meridian east.

In Canada, the meridian forms the boundary between Nunavut and the Northwest Territories north of the parallel 70° north.  Originally 110°W was intended as the Fourth Meridian for the Dominion Land Survey, but because of the imperfect surveying methods of the time, the meridian was placed a few hundred metres west of this longitude. The Fourth Meridian has been the entire boundary between Alberta and Saskatchewan since 1905.

In the United States, the meridian formed the western border of the historic and extralegal Territory of Jefferson.

From pole to pole
Starting at the North Pole and heading south to the South Pole, the 110th meridian west passes through:

{| class="wikitable plainrowheaders"
! scope="col" width="130" | Co-ordinates
! scope="col" | Country, territory or sea
! scope="col" | Notes
|-
| style="background:#b0e0e6;" | 
! scope="row" style="background:#b0e0e6;" | Arctic Ocean
| style="background:#b0e0e6;" |
|-
| 
! scope="row" | Canada
| Northwest Territories / Nunavut border — Borden Island
|-
| style="background:#b0e0e6;" | 
! scope="row" style="background:#b0e0e6;" | Wilkins Strait
| style="background:#b0e0e6;" |
|-
| 
! scope="row" | Canada
| Northwest Territories / Nunavut border — Mackenzie King Island
|-
| style="background:#b0e0e6;" | 
! scope="row" style="background:#b0e0e6;" | Unnamed waterbody
| style="background:#b0e0e6;" |
|-
| 
! scope="row" | Canada
| Northwest Territories / Nunavut border — Melville Island
|-
| style="background:#b0e0e6;" | 
! scope="row" style="background:#b0e0e6;" | Eldridge Bay
| style="background:#b0e0e6;" |
|-
| 
! scope="row" | Canada
| Northwest Territories / Nunavut border — Melville Island (for about 2 km)
|-
| style="background:#b0e0e6;" | 
! scope="row" style="background:#b0e0e6;" | Sabine Bay
| style="background:#b0e0e6;" |
|-
| 
! scope="row" | Canada
| Northwest Territories / Nunavut border — Melville Island
|-
| style="background:#b0e0e6;" | 
! scope="row" style="background:#b0e0e6;" | Parry Channel
| style="background:#b0e0e6;" | Viscount Melville Sound
|-valign="top"
| 
! scope="row" | Canada
|-
| style="background:#b0e0e6;" | 
! scope="row" style="background:#b0e0e6;" | Coronation Gulf
| style="background:#b0e0e6;" |
|-valign="top"
| 
! scope="row" | Canada
|-valign="top"
| 
! scope="row" | United States
| Montana Wyoming — from  Utah — from  Arizona — from 
|-
| 
! scope="row" | Mexico
| Sonora  — passing just west of Ciudad Obregón at 
|-
| style="background:#b0e0e6;" | 
! scope="row" style="background:#b0e0e6;" | Gulf of California
| style="background:#b0e0e6;" | 
|-
| 
! scope="row" | Mexico
| Baja California Sur
|-
| style="background:#b0e0e6;" | 
! scope="row" style="background:#b0e0e6;" | Pacific Ocean
| style="background:#b0e0e6;" |
|-
| style="background:#b0e0e6;" | 
! scope="row" style="background:#b0e0e6;" | Southern Ocean
| style="background:#b0e0e6;" |
|-
| 
! scope="row" | Antarctica
| Unclaimed territory — passing through the Walgreen Coast of Marie Byrd Land
|-
|}

See also
109th meridian west
111th meridian west

References

w110 meridian west
Borders of Nunavut
Borders of the Northwest Territories
Borders of Saskatchewan
Borders of Alberta